Märchen is the German diminutive of the obsolete German word Mär, meaning "news, tale" (see Märchen).  It may refer to:
 A fairy tale, a type of short story that typically features folkloric characters, such as fairies, goblins, elves, trolls, dwarves, giants or gnomes, and usually magic or enchantments
 A type of musical composition
 The Russian composer Nikolai Medtner wrote many examples for solo piano (1880–1951), his original Russian title for the pieces Skazki is often replaced by Märchen
 Märchenbilder (Schumann) for viola and piano, by Robert Schumann

Märchen or Marchen may also refer to:

 Marchen script, used for writing the Zhang-Zhung language
Marchen (Unicode block)
 Marchen Maersk, Danish container ship
 Märchen (album), a 2010 story album by the Japanese musical group Sound Horizon
 The Green Snake and the Beautiful Lily (German: Märchen), German fairy tale
 Marchen face, face type used in 205 series